Tamiang Layang (abbreviated: TML), a sub-district in the district of Dusun Timur, is the regency seat of East Barito Regency and also one of the towns in Central Kalimantan. This town is at a distance of 287 km east of Palangka Raya city, the capital of Central Kalimantan Province. The population of this town is roughly 10,780 people as of 2021.

Geography 

Tamiang Layang is located at the eastern part of Central Kalimantan. To be precise, this town is located at 2.1160 S and 115.1691 E. Tamiang layang is also the most eastern town in Central Kalimantan and this makes it 81 km closer to the city of Banjarbaru, the capital of South Kalimantan than to Palangka Raya City, the capital of its province, Central Kalimantan. The total area of this town is about 45.56 km² which makes it roughly 1.2% of the total area of East Barito Regency.

Tamiang Layang is traversed by Sirau River, one of the major rivers crossing the East Barito Regency. This town is situated on a flat land of eastern Central Kalimantan with the elevation only reaching 11 metres above sea level. The climate of this town is tropical rainforest (Af) with huge amounts of precipitation almost all year long, constant high humidity, and temperature always above 20°C.

Demographics 
The population of Tamiang Layang as of 2021 is about 10,780 inhabitants which represents 37.8% of the population of Dusun Timur district and 9.5% of the entire population of East Barito Regency. The population density of this town is roughly 236.6/km². In Tamiang Layang as of 2021, there are roughly 2,601 households and the average household size of the town is about 4.1 people. The sex ratio of this town is 102 which means there are 102 males to every 100 females

Education 
As of 2021, there are currently six primary schools (five public schools & one Catholic private school), four middle schools (all public schools), one public high school, two public vocational schools, and one Christian theological college.

Public facilities 
For health facility, Tamiang Layang currently has one general hospital, nine pharmacies, and one public health centre. For economic facilities, this town currently has six shopping complexes, one big market, two minimarkets, 31 grocery stores, 241 restaurants, 289 food stalls, six hotels, and two inns. Also,  this town has more than 20 religious facilities. There are currently twelve Islamic religious facilities, eleven Protestant churches, and one Catholic church.

Reference 

Populated places in Central Kalimantan
Regency seats of Central Kalimantan
East Barito Regency